Ana María Rendón Martínez (born March 10, 1986) is a Colombian recurve archer. She has competed in the Olympic Games three times and is a two-time gold medalist at the Pan American Games.

Career

2008 Summer Olympics
At the 2008 Summer Olympics in Beijing Rendón finished her ranking round with a total of 647 points. This gave her the 10th seed for the final competition bracket in which she faced Elena Tonetta in the first round. Both archers scored 106 points in the regular match, but in the decisive extra round Rendón scored 10 points against 9 for Tonetta and advanced to the next round. There she won with 110-106 against Miroslava Dagbaeva. In the round of 16 she could only score 95 points and as her opponent Khatuna Lorig scored 107 points Rendón was eliminated. Together with Natalia Sánchez and Sigrid Romero she also took part in the team event. With her 647 score from the ranking round combined with the 643 of Sánchez and the 551 of Romero the Colombian team was in tenth position after the ranking round. In the first round they faced the Japanese team, but were unable to beat them. Japan advanced to the quarter finals with a 206-199 score.

2012 Summer Olympics
Rendón competed again at the 2012 Summer Olympics, this time only in the individual event. She finished as the twelfth seed in the ranking round but was defeated by Iria Grandal in the opening elimination round.

2016 Summer Olympics
Rendon represented Colombia at her third Olympics, the 2016 Summer Olympics in Rio de Janeiro.

Pan American Games
Rendón achieved two medals at the 2007 Pan American Games, winning the women's team gold medal and placing third in the women's individual event to secure the bronze medal. She did not participate in the 2011 Games four years later after she and her teammates Natalia Sánchez and Sigrid Romero disagreed with the training approach taken by the national coach Kim Hag Yong, with the trio requesting that Kim be replaced. The request was refused and the three were subsequently withdrawn from the competition by the Colombian Olympic Committee.

Rendón returned to the Pan American Games in 2015, winning the women's team gold medal with Sánchez and María Sepúlveda before finishing as the runner-up in the women's individual event to Khatuna Lorig.

References

External links
 

1986 births
Living people
Colombian female archers
Olympic archers of Colombia
Archers at the 2007 Pan American Games
Archers at the 2008 Summer Olympics
Archers at the 2012 Summer Olympics
Archers at the 2016 Summer Olympics
Sportspeople from Medellín
Pan American Games gold medalists for Colombia
Pan American Games silver medalists for Colombia
Pan American Games bronze medalists for Colombia
Pan American Games medalists in archery
Archers at the 2015 Pan American Games
Central American and Caribbean Games bronze medalists for Colombia
Competitors at the 2006 Central American and Caribbean Games
South American Games gold medalists for Colombia
South American Games bronze medalists for Colombia
Central American and Caribbean Games silver medalists for Colombia
South American Games medalists in archery
Competitors at the 2014 South American Games
Competitors at the 2018 South American Games
Competitors at the 2022 South American Games
Archers at the 2019 Pan American Games
Central American and Caribbean Games medalists in archery
Medalists at the 2019 Pan American Games
Medalists at the 2015 Pan American Games
20th-century Colombian women
21st-century Colombian women